Jacob Johannes 'Johan' Oosthuizen (born 4 July 1951) is a former South African rugby union player.

Playing career
Born in Worcester and a police officer by occupation, Oosthuizen made his provincial debut for Western Province in 1973.

He made his test debut for the Springboks in the first test against the 1974 British Lions at Newlands in Cape Town. His second test for the Springboks was against France during the end of the year tour to that country. He also played against France in 1975 and against the All Blacks in 1976. Along with his nine tests he played in five tour matches, scoring fifteen points for the Springboks.

Test history

See also
List of South Africa national rugby union players – Springbok no. 460

References

1951 births
Living people
South African rugby union players
South Africa international rugby union players
Western Province (rugby union) players
Rugby union players from Worcester, South Africa
Rugby union centres